Christ Church, officially The Parish of Christ Church, Hyde Park is a historic church building built in 1893 at 1220 River Road in Hyde Park, Massachusetts, a neighborhood of Boston. It is a parish of the Episcopal Diocese of Massachusetts.

Christ Church was the second church building designed by Ralph Adams Cram (after the nearby All Saints' Church, Ashmont), who went on to design many church buildings, notably the Cathedral of St. John the Divine, New York City. The church was built in 1893 and added to the National Historic Register in 1986.

See also
National Register of Historic Places listings in southern Boston, Massachusetts

References

Episcopal church buildings in Massachusetts
Episcopal churches in Boston
Churches on the National Register of Historic Places in Massachusetts
Ralph Adams Cram church buildings
National Register of Historic Places in Boston